WBFC may refer to:

 WBFC (AM), a radio station (1470 AM) licensed to Stanton, Kentucky, United States
 WBFC-LP, a low-power radio station (107.5 FM) licensed to Boynton, Georgia, United States
 Whitley Bay F.C., a football team from Whitley Bay, UK